Stanislau Uladzimiravich Tsivonchyk (born 5 March 1985 in Tiraspol, Moldavian SSR) is a Belarusian pole vaulter. He competed in the pole vault event at the 2012 Summer Olympics.

References

People from Tiraspol
Belarusian male pole vaulters
1985 births
Living people
Olympic athletes of Belarus
Athletes (track and field) at the 2012 Summer Olympics